Under Fire is a 1983 American political thriller film set during the last days of the Nicaraguan Revolution that ended the Somoza regime in 1979. Directed by Roger Spottiswoode, it stars Nick Nolte, Gene Hackman and Joanna Cassidy. The musical score by Jerry Goldsmith, which featured jazz guitarist Pat Metheny, was nominated for an Oscar for Best Original Score. The editing by Mark Conte and John Bloom was nominated for a BAFTA Award for Best Editing. The film was shot in the Mexican states of Chiapas and Oaxaca.

Plot
Russell Price is a photojournalist covering a military conflict in Chad, where he runs into Oates, a mercenary who he knows. Russell then returns to his hotel, where he attends a "Bon Voyage" party for his friend Alex Grazier, who is giving up covering foreign conflicts to take a lucrative job as a news anchor in New York. It is revealed that Russell is having an affair with Alex's girlfriend, fellow journalist Claire Stryder. Alex's article about the conflict in Chad is paired with Russell's photography to land a cover story in Time magazine.

The journalists then travel to Nicaragua to join the international press corps covering a conflict between the government of President Somoza and rebels lead by Rafael, an underground figure who has never been photographed. Russell is arrested for no legitimate reason and spends a night in jail. He and Claire meet Marcel Jazy, a French spy who is closely connected to Somoza, who tips them off that they might find Rafael in León, even though the press corps believes the fighting is shifting to Masaya.

They go to León and cover an intense rooftop gun battle between rebels and government troops. Russell meets rebels led by Pedro who gives him a baseball to take to Dennis Martinez. After more fighting, Russell again meets Oates, who is now fighting for the Nicaraguan government. Afterwards, Oates shoots Pedro in the back, killing him, but Russell does not reveal Oates' location, in order to avoid picking a side in the conflict.

Claire and Russell attend a press conference where President Somoza announces that Rafael has been killed. They then meet rebels who promise to take them to meet Rafael. Lead to a remote rebel stronghold, they realize that Rafael is indeed dead, and the rebels ask Russell to fake a living photo of their leader, believing this will sustain the movement long enough to win a victory. Although conflicted, Claire and Russell agree to help the rebels.

The photo is a success, and Alex comes to Nicaragua to get Russell to arrange an interview with Rafael. Alex learns of Russell's affair with his girlfriend, but does not sever his relationship with the photographer. The two go to find Rafael as the war escalates. They are detained and again meet Oates, who this time is with government troops who are conducting a mass execution. Russell learns from Oates that Jazy has been using him to get photographs of rebel leaders, who are then targeted for assassination.

Alex learns that Rafael is dead and Claire and Russell have violated journalistic ethics. Nevertheless, he agrees to not expose them, and will do a fluff piece on Jazy instead. Russell tries to arrange the interview, but fighting has become even more intense as the government is losing the war. Lost on their way back to the hotel, Alex asks government troops for assistance, but they are paranoid and execute him in the street while Russell takes pictures. Russell then escapes from the troops with the help of a local woman who hides him in her home.

Realizing it will end his regime if it is revealed that government troops killed a famous American journalist, President Somoza reports that rebels killed Alex and troops desperately search for Russell to kill him and destroy the pictures. Russell witnesses rebels killing Jazy. Claire is able to get the negatives back to the hotel, then goes to find Russell.

Russell's photographs are broadcast worldwide and Somoza flees to Miami. With the rebels victorious, Claire and Russell are reunited and leave the country. In the final scene, she asks "Do you think we fell in love with too much?", and he replies "I'd do it again".

Cast

Historical basis
Though the film is largely fictional, it was inspired by the murder of ABC reporter Bill Stewart and his translator Juan Espinoza by Nicaraguan National Guard troops on June 20, 1979. ABC cameraman Jack Clark was shooting "incidental" footage, and caught the entire episode on tape. The footage was shown on national television in the United States and became a major international incident, undermining what remained of dictator Anastasio Somoza's support. The US Government had already stopped military aid to Nicaragua and its National Guard in 1978, but the incident was the final straw for the Carter Administration's relationship with Somoza, whose regime fell on July 19.

Reception

Box office
Under Fire opened October 21, 1983 in 816 theaters, earning $1,837,768 ($2,252 average per theater) its opening weekend.  The film went on to gross a total of $5,696,391 in North America.

Critical response
Under Fire received a positive response from critics and holds a 90% "Fresh" rating on the review aggregator Rotten Tomatoes from 20 reviews.

Roger Ebert of the Chicago Sun-Times awarded the film three and a half out of four stars, praising the performances and declaring it one of the year's best films, saying, "The actors in Under Fire never step wrong. Nolte is great to watch as the seedy photographer with the beer gut. Hackman never really convinced me that he could be an anchorman, but he did a better thing. He convinced me that he thought he could be one. Joanna Cassidy takes a role that could have been dismissed as 'the girl' and fills it out as a fascinating, textured adult. Under Fire surrounds these performances with a vivid sense of place and becomes, somewhat surprisingly, one of the year's best films."  Geoff Andrew of Time Out praised the film as "tak[ing] an honourable place alongside classic war-torn romance pictures like Casablanca and To Have and Have Not" and concluded by calling it "a thrilling film, with a head, a heart, and muscle."

John Simon of the National Review wrote- "Under Fire is no masterpiece, but it gives you plenty to absorb and think about. How many films nowadays can make that claim?"

Vincent Canby of The New York Times, however, viewed the film less favorably, saying "Under Fire, which was written by Ron Shelton and Clayton Frohman, from a story by Mr. Frohman, means well but it is fatally confused. It's silly enough to use a real, bloody war as the backdrop - the excuse, really - for the raising of the consciousnesses of a couple of mini-characters."

See also
 List of American films of 1983

References

External links
 
 
 

 Under Fire (1983) movie script sfy.ru

1983 films
1980s political thriller films
Cold War films
1980s English-language films
Films about journalists
Films about Latin American military dictatorships
Films about war correspondents
Films set in Nicaragua
Orion Pictures films
American political thriller films
Films directed by Roger Spottiswoode
Films scored by Jerry Goldsmith
Nicaraguan Revolution
Films shot in Mexico
1980s Spanish-language films
Films set in 1979
1983 multilingual films
American multilingual films
1980s American films